Mictyris platycheles is a species of crab found on mudflats on the east coast of Australia from Tasmania and Victoria to Queensland. They live in large groups, so are commonly called soldier crabs. Mictyris platycheles gets its food by picking up balls of sands and putting it in its mouth, which filters out the food particles (detritus).

References

Ocypodoidea
Marine fauna of Eastern Australia
Marine fauna of Tasmania
Crustaceans described in 1852
Taxa named by Henri Milne-Edwards